The Gendarmerie Corps of Vatican City State is the gendarmerie, or police and security force, of Vatican City and the extraterritorial properties of the Holy See. It was founded in 1816 as Corps of Gendarmes by Pope Pius VII, renamed the Central Security Office in 1970, the Security Corps in 1991, and was restored to its original name in 2002.

The corps numbered 130 as of 2017. It is led by Inspector General Gianluca Gauzzi Broccoletti, who has served on the Vatican gendarmerie since 1995 and who was made deputy leader in 2018. He was appointed by Pope Francis on 15 October 2019.

History 

In 1816, after the dissolution of the Napoleonic empire, Pope Pius VII founded the Papal Carabinieri Corps for the service of the Papal States.

In 1849, under Pope Pius IX, it was renamed, first as the Papal Velites Regiment, and then as the Papal Gendarmerie Corps. It was charged with ensuring public security and passed from dependence on the Ministry of the Army to dependence on the Cardinal Secretary of State. 
It took an active part in the battles that finally led to the complete conquest of the Papal States by the victorious Kingdom of Italy.

After the capture of Rome in 1870, a small group of members of the Corps continued to serve in the papal residence and the gardens.

In 1929, the force was expanded to deal with its duties in the newly founded Vatican City State and in the buildings and other areas over which the Holy See had extraterritorial rights.

When in 1970 Pope Paul VI abolished all the military bodies in Papal service except the Swiss Guards, the Gendarmerie was transformed into a Central Security Office, with the duties of protecting the Pope, defending Vatican City, and providing police and security services within its territory.

Its name was changed in 1991 to Security Corps of Vatican City State and in 2002 to Gendarmerie Corps of Vatican City State.

Organization 

The corps is responsible for security, public order, border control, traffic control, criminal investigation, and other general police duties in Vatican City.

The Vatican Gendarmerie includes two special units, the Rapid Intervention Group (Celeri Interventu Coetus; C.I.C., ; G.I.R.) and an Anti-Sabotage Unit (Antiocculte pessumdare unitatis). Since 2000 an operations and control room, staffed 24 hours a day, coordinates the response of the Vatican security services in the case of an emergency.

The Interpol National Central Bureau for Vatican City, tasked with collecting and sharing relevant information on crime and security with Interpol, an organisation of which Vatican City is a full member since 2008, is also part of the Vatican Gendarmerie.

While the protection of the Pope's person is primarily the Swiss Guard's responsibility, the gendarmes ensure public order at the audiences, meetings and ceremonies at which he is present. In Italian territory and other countries, this is done in liaison with the local police authorities.

In 2015, the Gendarmerie made eight arrests.

Numbers
There are a number of different roles within the Gendarmerie. Ranks are shown in the structure below.
Some members of the Gendarmerie are officers, some are gendarmes.

99 officers;
3 department heads, 
8 main police chiefs, 
16 police commissioners, 
32 inspectors, 
40 vice-inspectors;
94 gendarmes.

Gendarmes 
To qualify for enrollment as a gendarme, a person must be an unmarried male, between the ages of 21 to 24, of good health and a practising Catholic. There are also minimum requirements of height and education—standing at least , and being a high school graduate.

Military service is not a requirement, but is advantageous (in Italy there are two national military police forces in addition to civilian police forces).

The Gendarmerie's patron saint is Saint Michael the Archangel. Since 1977, the oratory of San Pellegrino in Vaticano serves as the chapel of the Gendarmerie. The church previously served as the chapel of the Pontifical Swiss Guard.

Band  
The Band of the Gendarmerie (Latin: Cohors Gendarmerie Corps) is a uniformed band of musicians that serves at Gendarmerie events and also serves as the official marching band of Vatican City.

In October 2007, the band is the heir to the Papal Gendarmerie band founded in 1851 and in turn descended from the musical formations of the body of the Pontifical Velites. The band is made up of about 100 musicians and volunteers coming from the Italian military bands such as the Italian Army Music Band and the National Carabinieri Band.

Training and operations 

The Gendarmerie are responsible for policing the whole of Vatican City State (however the Italian Polizia di Stato and sometimes Italian Carabinieri patrol St. Peter's Square).

Twenty of the one hundred and thirty-eight Vatican officers have received “special training” for countering “anti-terrorist actions”. Some of these officers accompany the Pope during his international travels.

The Vatican has an operational centre “of high technological level,” and thousands of surveillance cameras, as well as in extraterritorial Vatican properties.

Rapid Intervention Group (GIR) 
The Gendarmerie has a Rapid Intervention Group (GIR) trained for various situations to respond to threats more effectively:
shooting procedures
combat in a restricted environment
anti-sabotage
breaching

Other security services in the Vatican 

The Commandant of the Gendarmerie Corps is the head of the Directorate of Security and Civil Protection Services, which also oversees the Vatican fire brigade.

Security in Vatican City is also provided by the Pontifical Swiss Guard, a military unit of the Holy See, not Vatican City State. The Swiss Guard are responsible for the security of the Pope, dignitaries and all papal buildings. The Swiss Guard have maintained a centuries-long tradition of carrying swords and spears, unlike the Gendarmerie Corps.

Relationship with Italy 
As Vatican City State is a country within another country and due to the nature of the policing duties of the Gendarmerie, the Vatican Government and Gendarmerie maintain strong links with the Italian police and authorities. Sometimes, they will visibly assist each other in times of crisis, such as the earthquake in 2016, when the Pope reportedly sent some gendarmes to assist in the rescue but also keeping law and order. The gendarmes sent were in their uniform and carrying their firearms, as it was reported that there were looters in and amongst the area. Members of the Vatican Fire Brigade and Pontifical Swiss Guard, were also sent to help.

Likewise, the Italian Arma dei Carabinieri (Italian state military police) and Polizia di Stato (Italian national civil state police) are seen in and around St. Peter's Square (Vatican territory) policing the crowds and carrying out protective duties.

Equipment and vehicles

Firearms and self-defence weapons
The Gendarmerie is equipped with weapons to protect Vatican City State.

The Glock semi-automatic pistol (various versions) in 9 mm Parabellum is the standard-issue weapon.

They also have more powerful weapons, such as:

the Beretta M12
the Heckler & Koch MP5 sub-machine gun, a weapon also used by the Italian police.

Against possible riots, they are supplied with batons, tasers, pepper sprays and tear gas.

For the elite-unit Rapid Intervention Group (GIR), members are equipped with the Carbon 15 carbine and Heckler & Koch FABARM FP6 shotguns.

Swords are carried for ceremonial duties.

Vehicles
In 2010, Ducati presented two police motorbikes to the Gendarmeria, designed in the white and yellow colors of the Vatican.

In September 2012, the Gendarmerie was equipped with one Kangoo Maxi ZE electric car.

Later, in 2012 the donations of a Fiat Bravo and a Renault Kangoo led to the debut of a blue livery with a white-gold band, initially with the words "Gendarmeria Vaticana" then simply changed to "Gendarmeria".

List of Vehicles
Ducati motorbikes (marked) (2) (SCV064 & SCV065)
Harley-Davidson Road King motorbikes (marked) (2) (SCV0176 and SCV0177)
Four-person buggy
Volkswagen E-up! electric cars (marked) (2)
Fiat Bravo (marked) (1)
Smart ForTwo (marked) (2) 
Renault Kangoo Maxi ZE electric car (marked) (1)
VW Passat cars for escort work (unmarked) (2)
Fiat Ducato van (control/communications unit) (1)
Iveco Daily Anti-sabotage unit van and trailer (1)
Mercedes-Benz G-class open-top pickup for the Rapid Intervention Group (GIR) (1)

All of these vehicles are registered in Vatican City State with 'SCV' preceding the numbers on all vehicle registration plates (the Pope's vehicles wear 'SCV1').

The vehicles are also equipped with blue flashing lights.

Other Equipment
Radios are carried and used with earpieces & microphones on duty.

Uniforms

Before 1970, the 180 Pontifical Gendarmes wore elaborate ceremonial uniforms of 19th-century origin. These included bearskin headdresses with red plumes, black coatees with white-fringed epaulettes, white doeskin breeches and knee-high riding boots. In service dress bicornes and blue trousers were substituted.

The present-day Vatican City gendarmes wear dark blue modern police uniforms. There are different orders of dress for different occasions and seasons (as well as weather). However, rank, insignia and decorations do not differ between uniforms.

Everyday Dress
Blue kepi (cap) with cap badge
White shirt
Black tie
Blue tunic with four pockets or long black jacket or short black bomber jacket
Pocket badge
Blue trousers with a black stripe down the side
Black boots.

Dress-down Uniform
(worn when the above is impractical/unsuitable)
Light blue polo shirt
Dark blue trousers
V-neck jumper
Jacket
Baseball cap
Black boots/shoes

Special/Practical Duties 
Dark blue shirt-jacket
Dark blue cargo trousers
Helmet
Square baseball cap
Beret
Black boots

Plain clothes

A dark suit may be worn when gendarmes carry out close protection duties (e.g. assisting the Swiss Guard with protecting the Pope)

Ceremonial Dress
Blue kepi (cap) with cap badge
White shirt
Black tie
Blue tunic with four pockets 
Pocket badge
Blue trousers with a black stripe down the side
Dark blue cape with clasp (wintertime)
Black waist belts with belt badge over tunic (with or without closed pistol holster or sword)
Officers wear gold and yellow shoulder sash
White gloves
Medals are worn on the left breast (if any)
Black boots

Ranks
The ranks of the Corps of Gendarmerie was adopted in 2002 with the renaming of the Security Corps.

Commanders

Arcangelo De Mandato (1922-1942)
Adolfo Soleti (1942-1944)
Mario Pericoli (1944-1958)
Francesco Saverio Bernado (1959-1961)
Spartaco Angelini (1961-1971)
Camillo Cibin (1 August 1972 – 2 June 2006 )
Domenico Giani (3 June 2006 – 14 October 2019 )
Gianluca Gauzzi Broccoletti (15 October 2019 – present)

See also
 Crime in Vatican City
 Index of Vatican City-related articles
Swiss Guards
Papal Army
Military of Vatican City
Noble Guard (Vatican)
Palatine Guard
Pontifical Swiss Guard
Papal Zouaves
Corsican Guard

References

External links

 

Vatican City
Law enforcement in Vatican City
1816 establishments in the Papal States